Major General Alexander Whitmore Colquhoun Richardson (11 May 1887 – 22 July 1964) was a British Army officer and bobsledder who competed during at the 1924 Winter Olympics in Chamonix.

Richardson was born at Gerrards Cross, Buckinghamshire. He served in the First World War in the Bedfordshire Regiment reaching the rank of Major and was awarded the Distinguished Service Order.

Richardson was a member of the four-man bobsled team with Ralph Broome, Thomas Arnold und Rodney Soher who won silver medal in the 1924 Winter Olympics.

From 1930 until his retirement in 1931 Richardson was Commanding Officer 4th Battalion Royal Tank Corps. He was recalled in 1938 and became Commanding Officer 84th Anti-Aircraft Brigade. From 1940 to 1941 he was Commanding Officer 26th Armoured Brigade and then became Director-General Armoured Fighting Vehicles at the War Office He became Brigadier General Staff 2nd Army in 1942 and in 1943 Chief of Staff 18th Army Group, Tunisia and then Chief of Staff 15th Army Group, Italy. He retired in 1945.

Richardson's son Guy Richardson won a silver medal rowing at the 1948 Summer Olympics.

References

Bobsleigh four-man Olympic medalists for 1924, 1932-56, and since 1964
DatabaseOlympics.com profile
Wallenchinsky, David. (1984). "Bobsled: Four-Man". In The Complete Book the Olympics: 1896–1980. New York: Penguin Books. p. 559.

1887 births
1964 deaths
Olympic bobsledders of Great Britain
Bobsledders at the 1924 Winter Olympics
British male bobsledders
British Army personnel of World War I
British Army personnel of World War II
Olympic medalists in bobsleigh
Bedfordshire and Hertfordshire Regiment officers
Medalists at the 1924 Winter Olympics
Olympic silver medallists for Great Britain